This is a list of defunct airlines of El Salvador.

See also
 List of airlines of El Salvador
 List of airports in El Salvador

References

El Salvador